Salassa lola is a moth of the family Saturniidae first described by John O. Westwood in 1847. It is found in South-east Asia, including Nepal, India and Thailand.

References

Saturniinae
Moths described in 1847